Government Rajendra College is a public college, located in Faridpur, Bangladesh. It offers higher-secondary education (HSC). It has bachelor's degree and master's degree programmes as well, which divisions are affiliated with National University. Currently Professor Asim Kumar Saha is the principal of the college. Among 685 colleges under National University, Government Rajendra College is ranked 28th according to National University College Ranking 2015.  It was established by Ambica Charan Mazumdar in 1918.

Academic departments

Notable alumni
Abu Ishaque, novelist
Sarwar Jahan Mia, politician & MP of  Faridpur-5 constituency 
Quazi Deen Mohammad, neurologist

Gallery

References

Colleges in Faridpur District
Universities and colleges in Faridpur District
Educational institutions established in 1918
1918 establishments in British India